Alburquerque may refer to:

People
 Al Alburquerque (born 1986), Dominican professional baseball player
 Rafael Alburquerque (born 1940), former vice president of the Dominican Republic
 Eleanor of Alburquerque (1374–1435), Queen consort of Aragon by her marriage to Ferdinand I of Aragon
 Beatrice, Countess of Alburquerque (1347/1351–1381), daughter of Portuguese King Peter I and a Castilian noblewoman
 Sancho Alfonso, 1st Count of Alburquerque (1342–1375), illegitimate child of King Alfonso XI of Castile

Places and structures
 Alburquerque, Badajoz, a town in Spain
 Alburquerque, Bohol, a municipality in the Philippines

Other
 Duke of Alburquerque, a Spanish aristocratic title

See also
Alquerque, a board game considered to be the parent of draughts (checkers)

Spanish-language surnames